Ādolfs is a Latvian masculine given name, a variant of Adolf, and may refer to:
Ādolfs Alunāns (1848–1912), Latvian playwright, director and actor 
Ādolfs Bļodnieks (1889–1962), Latvian politician, former Prime Minister of Latvia 
Ādolfs Greble (1902–1943), Latvian footballer
Ādolfs Petrovskis (1912–1972), Latvian ice hockey player
Ādolfs Sīmanis (1909–1979), Latvian footballer
Ādolfs Skulte (1909–2000), Latvian composer and pedagogue

Latvian masculine given names